Borrowed Tunes II is a tribute album to Neil Young, released October 16, 2007. The album features a variety of Canadian musicians covering songs written by Neil Young. All proceeds from album sales will benefit two not-for-profit organizations selected by Neil Young: The Bridge School and Toronto-based Safehaven.

Track listing

Disc 1

 54-40, "Borrowed Tune"
 Jets Overhead, "Mr. Soul"
 Dala, "Ohio (Medley)"
 Barenaked Ladies, "Wonderin'"
 City and Colour, "Cowgirl In the Sand"
 Harpoondodger & Pat Robitaille, "Sugar Mountain"
 Great Lake Swimmers, "Don't Cry No Tears"
 Danny Michel, "After the Goldrush"
 Finger Eleven, "Walk On"
 Andre, "Alabama"
 Tom Cochrane, "Old Man"
 Tom Wilson, "Expecting to Fly"
 Chantal Kreviazuk, "A Man Needs a Maid"
 Alana Levandoski, "Don't Be Denied"
 Ron Sexsmith, "Philadelphia"
 Dave Gunning, "A Dream That Can Last"
 Melissa McClelland, "Cinnamon Girl"
 Liam Titcomb, "Bandit"
 Kyle Riabko, "Helpless"

Disc 2

 Neverending White Lights, "Change Your Mind"
 Raine Maida, "Don't Let It Bring You Down"
 Jeremy Fisher, "Harvest
 The Trews, "Come On Baby Let's Go Downtown"
 Jorane, "Needle and the Damage Done"
 Grimskunk, "Rockin' In the Free World"
 Matt Mays, "Sample and Hold"
 Astrid Young, "Sleeps With Angels"
 Attack in Black, "A Man Needs a Maid"
 Blackie & The Rodeo Kings, "Unknown Legend"
 Adrienne Pierce, "Pocahontas"
 Joel Kroeker, "When God Made Me"
 The Saint Alvia Cartel, "Thrasher"
 Justin Nozuka, "Bad Fog of Loneliness"
 Cuff the Duke, "Words (Between the Lines of Age)"
 Tara MacLean, "Natural Beauty"
 George Canyon, "Harvest Moon"
 Chris Seldon, "Long May You Run"

Compilation albums by Canadian artists
Neil Young tribute albums
2007 compilation albums